Zainal Abidin bin Zin (born 7 March 1940) is a Malaysian politician who served as Deputy Minister of Defence from 2004 to 2008 and Deputy Minister of Home Affairs from 1999 to 2004.

Election results

Honours
  :
  Commander of the Order of the Perak State Crown (PMP) (1982)
  Knight Commander of the Order of the Perak State Crown (DPMP) – Dato' (1985)
  :
  Knight Companion of the Order of Sultan Ahmad Shah of Pahang (DSAP) – Dato' (2002)

Several places were named after him, including:
 Dewan Dato' Zainal Abidin Zin, Bagan Serai, Perak.

References

Living people
1940 births
People from Perak
Malaysian people of Malay descent
Malaysian Muslims
United Malays National Organisation politicians
Members of the Dewan Rakyat